Riverside is a neighbourhood on the eastern edge of Windsor, Ontario. It is best defined by the waterfront road, Riverside Drive, which runs parallel to the Detroit River. The western boundary is approximately Westminster Boulevard running easterly to Rendezvous Shores and the Windsor/Tecumseh town line. That town line is formally defined by a drainage ditch to the Eastern side of the Rendezvous property. Rendezvous Shores is a recent development on the lands which were a large grass field between a marine basin and the Rendezvous Tavern, the Tavern was approximately 1150 feet (350.5 m) south from the Lake St. Clair shore and the marine basin, while the adjoining properties were a maximum 800 feet (243.8 m), thus the marine basin jutted out into the southwest corner of Lake St. Clair. Most of the structure was break wall which was later landfilled to the east, and on most marine charts is referred to as Askin's Point.

Riverside was a town until annexed by Windsor on Jan. 1, 1966. It truly extends all the way to Tecumseh to the East but that 3 mile (4.8 km) stretch along Riverside Dr. of waterfront property and farms, is what would retrospectively be called a Hamlet in the city plans.

Climate

Historical 

Prohibition had a sizable influence on this area. The proximity to the monied interests of the U.S. led to the flourishing of several taverns that served not only as watering holes but as ties for American interests to secure alcohol. A party atmosphere persists to this day. Summer weekends still find the eastern end of Riverside Drive heavily used as many of Windsor's residents take part in this spirit and a drive through Riverside has the same draw today as it has since the dawn of the Motor City.

Grand Taverns of Riverside

 Edgewater Thomas Inn
 Island View Tavern (known as Abars)
 Rendezvous Tavern
 Menard's Tavern
 Lauzon Stop House
 Wolf's Hotel

References
 
The history of the Town of Riverside (1921 to 1966) has been published and recently released by local historian Richard A. Fullerton.

Neighbourhoods in Windsor, Ontario
Former towns in Ontario
Populated places established in 1921
1921 establishments in Ontario
1966 disestablishments in Ontario